Jech is a Czech surname. Notable people with the surname include:

Ctibor Jech, Czech ice hockey player
Jiří Jech (born 1975), Czech football referee
Thomas Jech (born 1944), mathematician

See also 
Jech Doab
Jech v. Burch (1979), US federal district court case

Czech-language surnames